The 1975 Major League Baseball postseason was the playoff tournament of Major League Baseball for the 1975 season. The winners of each division advance to the postseason and face each other in a League Championship Series to determine the pennant winners that face each other in the World Series.

In the American League, the Oakland Athletics made their fifth straight postseason appearance, and the Boston Red Sox made their first postseason appearance since the 1967 World Series. In the National League, the Cincinnati Reds returned for the fourth time in the past six seasons, and the Pittsburgh Pirates returned for the fifth time in the past six seasons. This edition of the postseason would replicate itself in 1990, as all four teams from the 1975 postseason would return that year.

The playoffs began on October 4, 1975, and concluded on October 22, 1975, with the Cincinnati Reds defeating the Boston Red Sox in seven games in the 1975 World Series. It was the first title for the Reds since 1940, and their third overall.

Playoff seeds
The following teams qualified for the postseason:

American League
 Boston Red Sox - 95–65, Clinched AL East
 Oakland Athletics - 98–64, Clinched AL West

National League
 Pittsburgh Pirates - 92–69, Clinched NL East
 Cincinnati Reds - 108–54, Clinched NL West

Playoff bracket

American League Championship Series

Oakland Athletics vs. Boston Red Sox

This was the first postseason meeting between the Red Sox and Athletics. The Red Sox shockingly swept the three-time defending World Series champion Athletics to advance to the World Series for the first time since 1967.

Luis Tiant pitched a complete game for the Red Sox as they blew out the Athletics, 7-1, in Game 1. In Game 2, the Athletics jumped out to an early 3-0 lead in the top of the fourth, but it was quickly erased as the Red Sox scored six unanswered runs over the course of the next five innings. When the series moved to Oakland for Game 3, the Red Sox jumped out to a 4-0 lead early and did not relinquish it, as they held on to win 5-3 and secure the pennant. Game 3 was the first night game in ALCS history.

The Red Sox and Athletics would meet in the postseason again three more times - in the ALCS in 1988 and 1990, and the 2003 ALDS, with the Athletics sweeping the former two series, and the Red Sox winning the latter. Oakland would not return to the postseason again until 1981. This was the last AL pennant won by the Red Sox until 1986, where they defeated the California Angels in seven games after trailing 3 games to 1.

National League Championship Series

Pittsburgh Pirates vs. Cincinnati Reds

This was the third postseason meeting between the Reds and Pirates (1970, 1972). The Reds swept the Pirates to advance to their third World Series appearance in five years.

This series was not close - Don Gullett pitched a complete game as the Reds blew out the Pirates in Game 1, and Fred Norman and Rawly Eastwick held the Pirates' offense to just one run scored in Game 2 as the Reds went up 2-0 in the series headed to Pittsburgh. In Game 3, the Pirates held a 2-1 lead after seven innings, until Pete Rose hit a two-run home run in the top of the eighth to put the Reds ahead for good, effectively securing the pennant. Game 3 was the first game of the NLCS played at night.

The Reds returned to the NLCS the next year, where they swept the Philadelphia Phillies en route to a second straight World Series title. The Pirates would make their next postseason appearance in 1979, where they got revenge on the Reds in the NLCS and went on to win the World Series over the Baltimore Orioles.

1975 World Series

Boston Red Sox (AL) vs. Cincinnati Reds (NL) 

†: postponed from October 18 due to rain

This World Series featured two teams with lengthy championship droughts. The Red Sox last won the World Series in 1918, while the Reds won their last title in 1940. 

In what many consider to be one of the greatest World Series ever played, the Reds defeated the Red Sox in seven games in a back-and-forth series. 

The Red Sox blew out the Reds in Game 1 as Luis Tiant allowed only five hits in a complete game performance, while the Reds took Game 2 by one run to tie the series. When the series shifted to Cincinnati, the Reds narrowly took Game 3 in extra innings to go up 2-1 in the series. In Game 4, Tiant pitched another complete game for the Red Sox on three-days rest as Boston evened the series. In Game 5, Don Gullett and closer Rawly Eastwick helped the Reds win by a 6-2 score to gain a 3-2 series lead going back to Fenway Park. 

Game 6 of the series is widely regarded as one of the greatest games ever played in World Series history - Boston's Fred Lynn got the Red Sox an early lead in the bottom of the first inning with a three-run home run, and after four more innings, the Reds scored three runs to tie the game at three runs each. The Reds then scored three more runs in the seventh and eighth innings to take a 6-3 lead, then Boston's Bernie Carbo hit another three-run home run to tie the game in the bottom of the eighth. Then, no runs were scored in the ninth, tenth, or eleventh innings of play. In the twelfth inning, Carlton Fisk hit one of the most famous walk-off home runs in postseason history to win the game for the Red Sox, and the series then moved on to a seventh game. Footage of the home run by Fisk can be viewed on sports highlights videos on YouTube and elsewhere on the Internet. 

In Game 7, the Red Sox again took an early 3-0 lead, however it would not hold, as the Reds rallied late in the sixth and seventh innings to tie the game, and then they took the lead for good in the top of the ninth thanks to a single by Joe Morgan which scored Ken Griffey. The Reds closed out the series in the bottom of the ninth to capture their first championship in 35 years. The Red Sox's collapse in Game 7 contributed to the popular mythology of the Curse of the Bambino, which had now been extended to 57 years by the Reds.

The Reds would go on to repeat as World Series champions the next year, sweeping the New York Yankees. The Red Sox would not return to the World Series again until 1986, where they fell to the New York Mets, also in seven games.

References

External links
 League Baseball Standings & Expanded Standings - 1975

 
Major League Baseball postseason